Cercosimma is a genus of moths of the family Noctuidae. It includes the subspecies C. electrodes.

References
Natural History Museum Lepidoptera genus database

Noctuidae